Jugorje pri Metliki is a small settlement in the Municipality of Metlika in the White Carniola area of southeastern Slovenia. The entire area is part of the traditional region of Lower Carniola and is now included in the Southeast Slovenia Statistical Region.

Name
The oldest records mention only the church in Jugorje (zu Sannd Veit in 1462), and the settlement itself did not appear in written records until 1763–87 (as Jugorie). The etymology of the name is unclear. The name of the settlement was changed from Jugorje to Jugorje pri Metliki in 1953.

Church
The local church is dedicated to Saint Vitus and belongs to the Parish of Suhor. It was first mentioned in written documents dating to 1354.

References

External links
Jugorje pri Metliki on Geopedia

Populated places in the Municipality of Metlika